Kingdom is the debut studio album by French singer Bilal Hassani. The album was released by Low Wood on 26 April 2019. The album peaked at number twenty-four on the French Albums Chart. The album includes the singles "Roi", "Jaloux" and "Fais beleck".

Singles
"Roi" was released the lead single from the album on 11 January 2019. The song peaked at number 23 on the French Singles Chart. The song will represent France at the Eurovision Song Contest 2019 in Tel Aviv, Israel. "Jaloux" was released the second single from the album on 21 March 2019. "Fais beleck" was released the third single from the album on 22 March 2019.

Track listing

Charts

Weekly charts

Year-end charts

Release history

References

2019 debut albums